Rudall is a town and locality in South Australia. It is named for the cadastral Hundred of Rudall, which was named after politician Samuel Rudall.

It is a grain and sheep service centre on the Eyre Peninsula. It is on the Eyre Peninsula Railway between Cummins and Kimba and the Birdseye Highway between Cleve and Lock.

Rudall Centre School opened in 1921 and closed in 1946, while the Hundred of Rudall School opened in 1917 and closed in 1949. A postal receiving office opened at Rudall on 3 January 1914, was upgraded to a post office on 1 January 1921, and became a community mail agent on 10 January 1992. It formerly had a Methodist church.

Rudall is located within the federal division of Grey, the state electoral district of Flinders and the local government area of the District Council of Cleve.

The government town of Taragoro

The former town whose site is located within the locality of Rudall is reported to be named after an Aboriginal word for "small black cormorant."

See also
Rudall Conservation Park

References

Towns in South Australia
Eyre Peninsula